The 2003 Myanmar Premier League season had 14 teams in competition. Finance and Revenue FC was the winning team.

Results

See also
2000 Myanmar Premier League
2004 Myanmar Premier League
2005 Myanmar Premier League
2006 Myanmar Premier League
2007 Myanmar Premier League
2008 Myanmar Premier League

References

Myanmar Premier League seasons
Burma
Burma
1